Henry Coit Kingsley (December 11, 1815, New Haven, Connecticut - December 19, 1886, New Haven, Connecticut) was an American lawyer who served as Director of the Cleveland and Pittsburgh Railroad Company and as Treasurer of Yale University

Biography
He was the second son of Professor James Luce Kingsley (Yale 1799) and Lydia (Coit) Kingsley.  He graduated from Yale University in 1834. After graduation he was employed for a few months as a private tutor, and in the autumn of 1835 entered the Yale Law School. Here he studied for two years, with the exception of the winter of 1836-37, which he spent in a law office in Columbus, Ohio. In December, 1837, he was admitted to the practice of law in Ohio, and established himself in Cleveland, in partnership with his brother (Yale 1832). He married, September 6, 1841, Cornelia H., elder daughter of John Day, of Cleveland, who died August 31, 1843, leaving a daughter, who died in 1862. He married again, August 26, 1846, Jane Handy, of Utica, N. Y., daughter of Briggs W. Thomas, of that place. He continued actively engaged in the practice of his profession, uniting with it land agencies, until the summer of 1852, when in consequence of the impaired health of himself and his wife, they went to Europe. On returning, in 1853, he removed his residence to New Haven.

In 1854 he was elected a Director of the Cleveland and Pittsburgh Railroad Company, which was then seriously embarrassed, and in 1857 became insolvent. From 1857 to 1866 Kingsley had the principal charge of the financial affairs of the company, which in 1862 regained a sound position. In July, 1862, he was elected Treasurer of Yale College, and he remained in this office until his death, fulfilling also during the same time many responsible private trusts.

On the morning of the 19th of November, 1886, while driving to his business he received a severe injury. A cart was driven against his carriage, and as a result, he was thrown violently forward upon one of the wheels. Two ribs were broken, and other injuries were received. For some weeks he seemed to be recovering, when unfavorable symptoms developed, and after severe and protracted suffering he died on the morning of December 19, at the age of 71. His wife survived him, without children.

References

1815 births
1886 deaths
Businesspeople from New Haven, Connecticut
19th-century American railroad executives
Road incident deaths in Connecticut
Yale University alumni